Calliostoma anderssoni is a species of sea snail, a marine gastropod mollusk in the family Calliostomatidae.

Description
The size of the shell varies between 5 mm and 25 mm.

Distribution
This species occurs in the Atlantic Ocean off Argentina.

References

External links
 To Encyclopedia of Life
 To World Register of Marine Species
 

anderssoni
Gastropods described in 1908